The U.S. Army's 63rd Cavalry Division, Organized Reserve, was created from the perceived need for additional cavalry units.  It numbered in succession of the Regular Army Divisions, which were not all active at its creation.

The 63rd Cavalry Division was located in the Mid-Atlantic United States.  The division was composed of personnel from Tennessee, Louisiana, Georgia, North Carolina, Texas, Oklahoma, & Colorado.

Organization
 Headquarters & Headquarters Troop
 155th Brigade
 309th Cavalry Regiment 
 310th Cavalry Regiment 
 156th Brigade
 311th Cavalry Regiment 
 312th Cavalry Regiment 
 863rd Field Artillery Regiment
 463rd Tank Company
 63rd Signal Troop
 583rd Ordnance Company
 463rd Quartermaster Squadron
 463rd Armored Car Squadron
 403rd Engineer Squadron
 363rd Medical Squadron

See also 
 United States Army branch insignia
 List of armored and cavalry regiments of the United States Army

References
 U.S. Army Order of Battle 1919–1941, Volume 2. The Arms: Cavalry, Field Artillery, and Coast Artillery, 1919–41 by Lieutenant Colonel (Retired) Steven E. Clay, Combat Studies Institute Press, Fort Leavenworth, KS, 2011
 Maneuver and Firepower, The Evolution of Divisions and Separate Brigades, by John B. Wilson, Center of Military History, Washington D.C., 1998
 Cavalry Regiments of the U S Army by James A. Sawicki Wyvern Pubns; June 1985
”, The Trading Post, Journal of the American Society of Military Insignia Collectors, April- June 2009, page 21

External links
Formations of the United States Army

63